Tumulla was a crossing loop part way up the steep Tumulla Bank on the Main Western railway line in New South Wales, Australia.

Overview
The loop opened in 1910, and was signalled for Up and Down Working.  The loop was about 400m long.

Because of the steep grades, there was a safety siding at the down hill end of the up loop in case of runaways.
There was also a catchpoint at the down hill end of the down loop.

The loop was closed around 1990.

Adjacent stations
 Georges Plains
 Wimbledon

See also
 Railway stations in New South Wales
 Passing loop

References

Disused regional railway stations in New South Wales
Railway stations in Australia opened in 1910
Railway stations closed in 1990